Sharon Green (born 1962), considered the "first female rapper" or emcee,  known by the rap moniker MC Sha-Rock. Born in Wilmington, North Carolina, she grew up in the South Bronx, New York City during the earliest years of hip hop culture.  Within the hip-hop community she has been referred to as the "Mother of the Mic" signifying her role as a prominent female figure among the early rappers. As a member of the first hip-hop crew to appear on national television, known as the Funky 4 + 1, her style of delivering raps on early mixtapes influenced notable rappers like MC Lyte and DMC (born Darryl McDaniels) of Run-DMC. McDaniels cited Green as a significant influence on the style of rapping associated with the pioneering group.

In her lyrics, Green repeatedly referred to herself as the "Plus One More" of the Funky 4 + 1.

Career 
Sha-Rock is the first female emcee-rapper of hip hop culture "on wax" or record on vinyl from its inception in the 1970s. She began as a local b-girl, or breakdancer, in the earliest days of South Bronx hip hop scene and culture in the late 1970s. The Funky 4 + 1, Sha-Rock being the plus one, had their first significant hit with the 12-inch single "Rapping and Rocking the House" on Sugarhill Records (1979) as well as "That's the Joint" (1980) which both appeared on national television. As an early pioneer affiliated with the Zulu Nation, MC Sha-Rock inspired a style of rapping emulated and made notable by Run DMC called the "echo chamber".

In 2010, Green published a book about her experiences titled “The Story of the Beginning and End of the First Hip Hop Female MC: Luminary Icon Sha-Rock.” She wrote this book about her life, and her impact that was felt in many aspects. Writing this autobiography was her way to break down all of her experiences, so that others are able to understand what she went through to get to where she is today. Her book contains recollections of experiences and challenges she endured throughout her journey in becoming an emcee. She addresses her time spent as a member of The Funky 4 + 1. During an interview, she stated that her goal is to make sure that she solidifies her group in history. Not only did she decide it was the right time in her life to sharing her story, but she also decided to write her memoirs because she felt wholehearted that it's not just her children's history, but that it's also the world's history. Her hope was that by telling the truth and sharing her story, that she could encourage aspiring young artists who may be at a crossroad at the moment.

On August 4, 2009, Sha-Rock was presented an award for "Women in Hip Hop All Female Rapathon and All Pioneer Luminary MC Award" presented by the Hip Hop cultural center of Harlem. Sha-rock went on to say that "for all of the young kids and parents that really embrace the culture and if they do not, the information is out there, get on the Internet and try to find out the history and the culture of Hip Hop". She urged those who do not know the true history to go out and research it and to not believe everything about it said by the mainstream. Sha-Rock stated that "throughout the years people change things, in order to make you believe what they want you to believe". As Sha-Rock says her closing words of the ceremony she states "that everyone please embrace the culture and make sure that you really understand that Hip Hop is really not just about rap and profit, it's about peace, unity and having fun. Listening to music, enjoying one another and being safe".

Her contribution to the hip hop culture has helped pave the way for today's female hip hop artists. She helped set the tone for female emcees to become well known and established in the hip hop music industry. She wanted female emcees to be taken just as serious as male artists. She also accredited DJ Kool Herc for helping her on her journey to become the emcee she is today. She even announced on Twitter that she'll be making a movie titled Luminary Icon.

Legacy 
Sharon Green Jackson aka MC Sha-Rock was a member of the first notable hip hop group that included a female MC and, according to popular music scholar, Kembrew McLeod, "the first group of their kind that released records commercially." Sha-Rock became the first prominent female MC in hip-hop, and the Funky 4 + 1 was the first rap group to appear on national television. Her contributions were groundbreaking in the early era of hip hop culture in the mid - to late 1970s. Sha-Rock was a founding member of the Funky 4 MC's, which later evolved into the Funky 4 + 1.

Of all members of the Funky 4 + 1, pop critic Robert Christgau reserved special praise for Green in his review of "That's the Joint", "Quick tradeoffs and clamorous breaks vary the steady-flow rhyming of the individual MCs, and when it comes to Sha-Rock, Miss Plus One herself, who needs variation?"

Later, McLeod framed her performance her presence in the early Bronx crews of emcees as defying the norms associated with women in hip hop:
A unique aspect of the group was that Sha Rock wasn't portrayed as a sex object but was more or less considered equal among the male members of the group. Aside from the minor success of the all-female Sugarhill Records rap crew The Sequence, Funky 4 + 1 signified the last moderate success of a woman in the rap industry until Roxanne Shanté and Salt-n-Pepa came along in the mid-'80s. 
On February 14, 1981, The Funky 4 + 1 were introduced as New York City "street rappers" from the Bronx along with headlining musical guests Blondie with its lead singer Debbie Harry on Saturday Night Live. The Funky 4 + 1's appearance reflected a local connection that introduced the uptown musical youth of the Bronx and Harlem to the downtown Lower East Side scenes of graffiti art and music that was represented with the original hip-hop artists playing themselves in the 1983 film Wild Style by Charlie Ahearn.

This creative link between various youthful artists was forged by the influencers like Fab Five Freddy and Ruza Blue, nicknamed "Kool Lady Blue", who curated acts at the Roxy NYC nightclub, which featured early hip-hop DJs and breakdancers. Blue appeared in classic hip-hop films like Stan Latham's Beat Street (1984) and has been honored in recent decades by various organizations for her pioneering contributions to hip hop emceeing. Sha-Rock has received many awards in her lifetime, including the honorary award from the Council of the City of New York.

References

External links 
 The Official Website of MC Sha-Rock

See also
Lady B

1962 births
21st-century American rappers
21st-century American women musicians
African-American women rappers
American women rappers
Living people
Rappers from the Bronx
21st-century African-American women
21st-century African-American musicians
20th-century African-American people
Funky 4 + 1 members
20th-century African-American women
21st-century women rappers